Gerald Howard-Smith MC (21 January 1880 – 19 March 1916) was an English solicitor and cricketer, active in first-class cricket from 1900 to 1903.

Early life and cricket career
Howard-Smith was born at Earl's Court on 21 January 1880 to Mary Beaumont O'Shaughnessy and her husband Philip Howard-Smith. He was educated at Eton College, before going onto study law at Trinity College, Cambridge. He made his debut in first-class cricket for the Marylebone Cricket Club (MCC) against Cambridge University at Fenner's in 1900. The following year he made his debut for Cambridge University in first-class matches against AJ Webbe's XI, taking a five wicket haul on debut with figures of 6/23 in AJ Webbe's XI's first-innings. From 1900 to 1903, he would make 20 appearances in first-class cricket; 17 for Cambridge University and three for the MCC. Playing primarily as a right-arm fast bowler, Howard-Smith was a reliable, if not overly effective bowler, taking 29 wickets at an average of 44.10, with one five wicket haul. He gained his Cambridge blue in 1903. While studying at Trinity he was the president of both Cambridge University Cricket Club and Cambridge University Athletic Club. Howard-Smith also won the varsity high jump against Oxford in 1901, 1902 and 1903, also competing in Canada.

After qualifying as a solicitor, he moved to Wolverhampton, where he joined the law firm Underhill, Thorneycroft & Smith and Neve, Co. He played club cricket locally for Wolverhampton Cricket Club, captaining the club. He was selected to play minor counties cricket for Staffordshire, playing in 1908 against Hertfordshire at Stoke-on-Trent, and once more in 1910 against Cheshire at Wolverhampton. These were his only appearances in the Minor Counties Championship.

War service and death
Shortly after the outbreak of World War I, Howard-Smith was commissioned as a second lieutenant in the South Staffordshire Regiment. His unit moved to frontline in March 1915, where shortly thereafter he was promoted to lieutenant and became the battalion bombing officer. He was awarded the Military Cross on 14 January 1916, for bravery during the Actions of the Hohenzollern Redoubt. He was known as the "anarchist" in his battalion due to his left-wing views. During the course of the war he was wounded three times, the third time fatally during action at Neuville-Saint-Vaast, France. Stretchered from the battlefield whistling It's a Long Way to Tipperary, he died shortly thereafter from complications at a field hospital on 29 March 1916. He is buried at the Aubigny Communal Cemetery Extension and is commemorated at St Mary's Church, Bushbury.

References

Further reading

External links
Gerald Howard-Smith at ESPNcricinfo
Gerald Howard-Smith at CricketArchive

1880 births
1916 deaths
Sportspeople from Kensington
People educated at Eton College
Alumni of Trinity College, Oxford
English cricketers
Marylebone Cricket Club cricketers
Cambridge University cricketers
Staffordshire cricketers
English solicitors
British Army personnel of World War I
South Staffordshire Regiment officers
Recipients of the Military Cross
Military personnel from Middlesex
British military personnel killed in World War I
20th-century English lawyers